Esfahrud (also Romanized as Esfahrūd, Esfahrood, and Esfeh Rūd; also known as Espahrūd, Esfī Rūd, and Isfehrūd) is a village in Baqeran Rural District, in the Central District of Birjand County, South Khorasan Province, Iran. At the 2006 census, its population was 192, in 68 families.

References 

Populated places in Birjand County